Osian Gwynn Ellis  (8 February 1928 – 5 January 2021) was a Welsh harpist, composer and teacher. He was principal harpist of the London Symphony Orchestra, a founding member of the Melos Ensemble, and a harp teacher at the Royal Academy of Music. Many composers wrote music for him. From 1959 onwards, Ellis had a close professional partnership with Benjamin Britten that lasted to the latter's death. He often first performed and recorded Britten's works.

Career 
Osian Gwynn Ellis was born in Ffynnongroew, Flintshire, in 1928, the son of the Rev. Tomos Ellis, a Welsh Methodist minister, and his wife Jenny (née Lewis), a harpist, and spent the first four years of his life at Llys Myfr on Llinegr Hill. As a boy Ellis was obsessed with playing the harp and playing football. In 2018 he recalled: "I chose the harp because we had one at home. My mother, Jennie, was a good amateur harpist... We did spend some years living in Denbigh and I was the goalkeeper for Denbigh County School. The boys used to say I was better at football than the harp! I taught myself to play the harp to some degree and was encouraged by my mother. We played lots of little concerts around Denbigh during the war. I also had a wonderful teacher Alwena Roberts, who taught students right across North Wales."

He studied at the Royal Academy of Music with Gwendolen Mason, whom he later succeeded as Professor of Harp from 1959 to 1989. He joined the London Symphony Orchestra in 1961 and became principal harpist. In 2018 he recalled: "I did two Royal Variety Performances in the pit at the London Palladium involving Bob Hope and many other top stars. I also joined the Wally Stott Orchestra and we played on the original Goon Shows starring Spike Milligan, Harry Secombe and Peter Sellers and, for a short time, Michael Bentine... In fact, I'm a bit embarrassed that each year I still get a royalty cheque for around £100 from the BBC from playing on the Goon Show as it's still repeated on radio so often today which is amazing." He was a founding member of the Melos Ensemble and also formed the Osian Ellis Harp Ensemble.

Ellis's 1959 recording of Handel's harp concertos (with Thurston Dart) won the Grand Prix du Disque. In 1962, the Melos Ensemble with Ellis released what is considered by musicologist Paul Loeber the finest rendition ever of Ravel's Introduction and Allegro, playing with flautist Richard Adeney, clarinettist Gervase de Peyer, violinists Emanuel Hurwitz and Ivor McMahon, violist Cecil Aronowitz and cellist Terence Weil. The record, released on the L'oiseau-Lyre label, OL 50217, included works by three other French composers — Debussy: Sonata for Flute, Viola and Harp; Albert Roussel: Serenade for Flute, Violin, Viola, Cello and Harp; and Guy Ropartz: Prelude, Marine and Chansons for Flute, Violin, Viola, Cello and Harp. He also took part in the ensemble's recording of Peter Maxwell Davies's cantata Leopardi Fragments.

Honours and awards
Ellis was made Commander of the Order of the British Empire in 1971.

He was the Honorary President of the Wales International Harp Festival and in 2018 was honoured at the festival, in Caernarfon, when a new work was premiered to celebrate his 90th birthday.

A portrait of Ellis with Peter Pears by photographer Nigel Luckhurst is held in the collection of the National Portrait Gallery, London.

Death
Ellis died on 5 January 2021, at the age of 92. Elinor Bennett, the director of the Wales International Harp Festival, said that Ellis was a huge inspiration to her and fellow musicians around the world. She said: "As the most prominent and outstanding harpist of his time, as harp teacher, composer, arranger, penillion singer and scholar, he contributed widely to the nation's traditional music as well as to developments in the European classical music of his day ... He encouraged many contemporary composers from Wales and farther afield to write new works for harp – including William Mathias, Alun Hoddinott, Rhian Samuel, David Wynne, Malcolm Arnold, Robin Holloway, Elizabeth Maconchy, William Alwyn, Gian Carlo Menotti and Jørgen Jersild. As a scholar, he published several seminal works on the history of the harp in Wales and he contributed to a myriad of television and radio programmes in Wales and London."

Influence on other musicians
Concertos were written for him by Alun Hoddinott (for the Cheltenham Festival in 1957), William Mathias (for the Llandaff Festival of 1970), Jørgen Jersild (1972), William Alwyn (1979) and Robin Holloway (1985).

Ellis is particularly known for his musical association with Benjamin Britten, with whom he collaborated extensively. Their relationship began when Ellis was the harpist in a performance of A Ceremony of Carols in London on 4 January 1959, conducted by George Malcolm, which resulted in an invitation to play at the Aldeburgh Festival the following year. Britten wrote the harp part in several of his major pieces with Ellis in mind, particularly A Midsummer Night's Dream, the War Requiem and the Church Parables. Britten also wrote his Harp Suite, Op. 83, for Ellis in 1969. Ellis appeared in many first recordings of Britten's pieces, often with Britten himself conducting. When Britten had to withdraw, due to heart surgery, from accompanying his partner, the tenor Peter Pears, on the piano, Ellis came to accompany Pears, and Britten wrote new pieces for them, including Canticle V: The Death of St Narcissus (1974) and A Birthday Hansel (1975).

Compositions and writings 
Ellis's own compositions drew on his Welsh heritage, including settings of Welsh folksongs for tenor and harp and settings of medieval Welsh strict metre poems. Diversions for two harps includes a cerdd dant setting of Dylan Thomas' poem "And death shall have no dominion".

His writings include The Story of the Harp in Wales (1991)  (a revision of an earlier publication in Welsh), which traces the harp's development and discusses some famous harpists.

Discography
Source:
 Franck: Sonata for Violin and Piano; Debussy: Sonatas; Ravel: Introduction and Allegro, 1988, London/Decca
 Masterworks for the Harp, 1993, Boston Skyline
 Diversions, 1994, Sain
 Mathias: Clarinet Concerto; Harp Concerto; Piano Concerto, 1995, Lyrita
 Harp Concertos, 1997, London
 17th & 18th-Century Harp Music, 2008, L'Oiseau-Lyre
 19th & 20th-Century Harp Music, 2008, L'Oiseau-Lyre
 Debussy & Ravel: String Quartets; Cello Sonata; Introduction & Allegro, 2016, Alto
 Songs with Harp, Eloquence Handel: Jephtha; Rodrigo; Concertos for Lute & Harp; Concerto Grosso, HWV 318, Decca/Eloquence

 References 

 External links 

 Osian Ellis (Harp, Arranger) – Bach Cantatas Website
 Warner, Matt: Tributes to harp legend Osian Ellis, The Leader'', 15 January 2021
 
 

Welsh classical harpists
Welsh classical composers
Alumni of the Royal Academy of Music
Academics of the Royal Academy of Music
Commanders of the Order of the British Empire
1928 births
2021 deaths
People from Flintshire
Welsh male classical composers